Niantania (N’ko: ߢߊ߲߬ߕߊ߬ߣߌ߲߬ߠߊ߬) is a town and sub-prefecture in the Mandiana Prefecture in the Kankan Region of eastern Guinea near the border with Mali. As of 2014 it had a population of 14,884 people.

References

Sub-prefectures of the Kankan Region